Hapi House! is a family situational comedy television series in the Philippines that was aired on IBC from 1987 to 1990. It starred Tito Sotto, Sandy Andolong, Chuckie Dreyfus, Isabel Granada, Laura Hermosa and Aga Muhlach. It was a Filipino version of American sitcom, Our House.
Reruns of the series was aired on IBC from February 11 to July 19, 2019.

Cast
Tito Sotto as Hapi
Sandy Andolong
Helen Gamboa
Chuckie Dreyfus
Isabel Granada as Bimbim
Laura Hermosa
Aga Muhlach as Rocky
Coney Reyes as Constancia/Constance

See also
List of Philippine television shows
List of programs previously broadcast by Intercontinental Broadcasting Corporation

1980s Philippine television series
1990s Philippine television series
1987 Philippine television series debuts
1990 Philippine television series endings
Filipino-language television shows
Intercontinental Broadcasting Corporation original programming
Philippine comedy television series
Television series by APT Entertainment